4′33″ (pronounced "four minutes, thirty-three seconds" or just "four thirty-three") is a three-movement composition by American experimental composer John Cage. It was composed in 1952, for any instrument or combination of instruments, and the score instructs performers not to play their instruments during the entire duration of the piece throughout the three movements. The piece consists of the sounds of the environment that the listeners hear while it is performed, although it is commonly perceived as "four minutes thirty-three seconds of silence". The title of the piece refers to the total length in minutes and seconds of a given performance, 4′33″ being the total length of the first public performance.

Conceived around 1947–48, while the composer was working on Sonatas and Interludes, 4′33″ became for Cage the epitome of his idea that any auditory experience may constitute music. It was also a reflection of the influence of Zen Buddhism, which Cage had studied since the late 1940s. In a 1982 interview, and on numerous other occasions, Cage stated that 4′33″ was, in his opinion, his most important work. The New Grove Dictionary of Music and Musicians describes 4′33″ as Cage's "most famous and controversial creation".

History of composition

Background and influences
Silence played a major role in several of Cage's works composed before 4′33″. The Duet for Two Flutes (1934), composed when Cage was 22, opens with silence, and silence was an important structural element in some of the Sonatas and Interludes (1946–48), Music of Changes (1951) and Two Pastorales (1951). The Concerto for prepared piano and orchestra (1951) closes with an extended silence, and Waiting (1952), a piano piece composed just a few months before 4′33″, consists of long silences framing a single, short ostinato pattern. Furthermore, in his songs The Wonderful Widow of Eighteen Springs (1942) and A Flower (1950) Cage directs the pianist to play a closed instrument, which may be understood as a metaphor of silence.

The first time Cage mentioned the idea of a piece composed entirely of silence was during a 1947 (or 1948) lecture at Vassar College, A Composer's Confessions. Cage told the audience that he had "several new desires", one of which was

At the time, however, Cage felt that such a piece would be "incomprehensible in the Western context", and was reluctant to write it down: "I didn't wish it to appear, even to me, as something easy to do or as a joke. I wanted to mean it utterly and be able to live with it." Painter Alfred Leslie recalls Cage presenting a "one-minute-of-silence talk" in front of a window during the late 1940s, while visiting Studio 35 at New York University.

In 1951, Cage visited the anechoic chamber at Harvard University. An anechoic chamber is a room designed in such a way that the walls, ceiling and floor absorb all sounds made in the room, rather than reflecting them as echoes. Such a chamber is also externally sound-proofed. Cage entered the chamber expecting to hear silence, but he wrote later, "I heard two sounds, one high and one low. When I described them to the engineer in charge, he informed me that the high one was my nervous system in operation, the low one my blood in circulation." Cage had gone to a place where he expected total silence, and yet heard sound. "Until I die there will be sounds. And they will continue following my death. One need not fear about the future of music." The realization as he saw it of the impossibility of silence led to the composition of 4′33″.

Another cited influence for this piece came from the field of the visual arts. Cage's friend and sometimes colleague Robert Rauschenberg had produced, in 1951, a series of white paintings, seemingly "blank" canvases (though painted with white house paint) that in fact change according to varying light conditions in the rooms in which they were hung, the shadows of people in the room and so on. This inspired Cage to use a similar idea, as he later stated, "Actually what pushed me into it was not guts but the example of Robert Rauschenberg. His white paintings ... when I saw those, I said, 'Oh yes, I must. Otherwise I'm lagging, otherwise music is lagging'." In an introduction to an article "On Robert Rauschenberg, Artist, and His Works", John Cage writes "To Whom It May Concern: The white paintings came first; my silent piece came later."

Precursors

Compositions that, like 4′33″, include no sounds produced by the performer, were conceived by a number of composers and writers before Cage. Examples include the following:
 Alphonse Allais's 1897 Funeral March for the Obsequies of a Deaf Man, consisting of twenty-four blank measures. Allais was an associate of Erik Satie, and given Cage's profound admiration for Satie, it is possible that Cage was inspired by the Funeral March. When asked, Cage claimed he was unaware of Allais's composition at the time.
 In Gaston Leroux's 1903 novel , silent concerts are given by the fictional Talpa people who dwell in the dark and silent Catacombs of Paris.
 Erwin Schulhoff's 1919 "In futurum", a movement from the Fünf Pittoresken for piano. The Czech composer's meticulously notated composition is made up entirely of rests.
 In Harold Acton's 1928 book Cornelian a musician conducts "performances consisting largely of silence".
 In 1947, jazz musician Dave Tough joked that he was writing a play in which "A string quartet is playing the most advanced music ever written. It's made up entirely of rests. ... Suddenly, the viola man jumps up in a rage and shakes his bow at the first violin. 'Lout', he screams, 'you played that last measure wrong.'"
 Yves Klein's 1949 Monotone-Silence Symphony (informally The Monotone Symphony, conceived 1947–48), an orchestral forty-minute piece whose second and final movement is a twenty-minute silence (the first movement being an unvarying twenty minute drone).

The musicologist Richard Taruskin has argued that 4′33″ is an example of automatism. Since the Romantic Era composers have been striving to produce music that could be separated from any social connections, transcending the boundaries of time and space. In automatism, composers wish to completely remove both the composers and the artist from the process of creation. This is motivated by the belief that what we think of as "self-expression" is really just an infusion of the art with the social standards that we have been subjected to since birth. Therefore, the only way to achieve truth is to remove the artist from the process of creation. Cage achieves that by employing chance (e.g., use of the I Ching, or tossing coins) to make compositional decisions. In 4′33″, neither artist nor composer has any impact on the piece, so that Cage has no way of controlling what ambient sounds will be heard by the audience.

Premiere and reception

The premiere of the three-movement 4′33″ was given by David Tudor on August 29, 1952, in Maverick Concert Hall, Woodstock, New York, as part of a recital of contemporary piano music. The audience saw him sit at the piano and, to mark the beginning of the piece, close the keyboard lid. Some time later he opened it briefly, to mark the end of the first movement. This process was repeated for the second and third movements.

In defining noise music and its value, Paul Hegarty in Noise/Music: A History (2007) contends that Cage's 4′33″ represents the beginning of noise music proper. For Hegarty, noise music, as with 4′33″, is that music made up of incidental sounds that represent perfectly the tension between "desirable" sound (properly played musical notes) and undesirable "noise" that make up all noise music.

4′33″ challenges, or rather exploits to a radical extent, the social regiments of the modern concert life etiquette, experimenting on unsuspecting concert-goers to prove an important point. First, the choice of a prestigious venue and the social status of the composer and the performers automatically heightens audience's expectations for the piece. As a result, the listener is more focused, giving Cage's 4′33″ the same amount of attention (or perhaps even more) as if it were Beethoven's Ninth. Thus, even before the performance, the reception of the work is already predetermined by the social setup of the concert. Furthermore, the audience's behavior is limited by the rules and regulation of the concert hall; they will quietly sit and listen to 4′33″ of ambient noise. It is not easy to get a large group of people to listen to ambient noise for nearly five minutes, unless they are regulated by the concert hall etiquette.

The second point made by 4′33″ concerns duration. According to Cage, duration is the essential building block of all of music. This distinction is motivated by the fact that duration is the only element shared by both silence and sound. As a result, the underlying structure of any musical piece consists of an organized sequence of "time buckets". They could be filled with either sounds, silence or noise; where neither of these elements is absolutely necessary for completeness. In the spirit of his teacher Schoenberg, Cage managed to emancipate the silence and the noise to make it an acceptable or perhaps even integral part of his music composition. 4′33″ serves as a radical and extreme illustration of this concept, asking that if the time buckets are the only necessary parts of the musical composition, then what stops the composer from filling them with no intentional sounds?

The third point is that the work of music is defined not only by its content but also by the behavior it elicits from the audience. In the case of Stravinsky's Rite of Spring, this would consist of widespread dissatisfaction leading up to violent riots. In Cage's 4′33″, the audience felt cheated by having to listen to no composed sounds from the performer. Nevertheless, in 4′33″ the audience contributed the bulk of the musical material of the piece. Since the piece consists of exclusively ambient noise, the audience's behavior, their whispers and movements, are essential elements that fill the above-mentioned time buckets.

In a 2013 TED talk, psychologist Paul Bloom put forward 4′33″ as one example to show that knowing about the origin of something influences our opinion about it as "that silence is different from other forms of silence". In 2013, Dale Eisinger of Complex ranked the composition eighth in his list of the greatest performance art works.

Versions of the score
Several versions of the score exist: There are four known later versions, one of which is in the New York Public Library.
 The original Woodstock manuscript (August 1952): conventional notation, dedicated to David Tudor. This manuscript is currently lost.
 The Kremen manuscript (1953): graphic, space-time notation, dedicated to Irwin Kremen. The movements of the piece are rendered as space between long vertical lines; a tempo indication is provided (60), and at the end of each movement the time is indicated in minutes and seconds. Edition Peters No. 6777a. Kremen was given the score by Cage on June 5, 1953, for his 28th birthday. The score was later purchased for the Museum of Modern Art by Henry R. Kravis in honor of his wife, Marie-Josée Drouin, the museum's president.
 The so-called First Tacet Edition: a typewritten score, lists the three movements using Roman numbers, with the word "TACET" underneath each. A note by Cage describes the first performance and mentions that "the work may be performed by any instrumentalist or combination of instrumentalists and last any length of time". Edition Peters No. 6777 (out of print).
 The so-called Second Tacet Edition: same as the First, except that it is printed in Cage's calligraphy, and the explanatory note mentions the Kremen manuscript.

There is some discrepancy between the lengths of individual movements of the premiere performance, specified in different versions of the score. The Woodstock printed program specifies the lengths 30″, 2′23″ and 1′40″, as does the Kremen manuscript, and presumably the original manuscript had the same indications. However, in the First Tacet Edition Cage writes that at the premiere the timings were 33″, 2′40″ and 1′20″. In the Second Tacet Edition he adds that after the premiere a copy has been made for Irwin Kremen, in which the lengths of the movements were 30″, 2′23″ and 1′40″. The causes of this discrepancy are not currently understood, the original manuscript being still lost.

4′33″ No. 2
In 1962, Cage wrote 0′00″, which is also referred to as 4′33″ No. 2. The directions originally consisted of one sentence: "In a situation provided with maximum amplification, perform a disciplined action." At the first performance Cage had to write that sentence.

The second performance added four new qualifications to the directions: "the performer should allow any interruptions of the action, the action should fulfill an obligation to others, the same action should not be used in more than one performance, and should not be the performance of a musical composition."

One3
In late 1989, three years before his death, Cage revisited the idea of 4′33″ one last time. He composed One3, the full title of which is One3 = 4′33″ (0′00″) + . As in all of the Number Pieces, "One" refers to the number of performers required. The score instructs the performer to build a sound system in the concert hall, so that "the whole hall is on the edge of feedback, without actually feeding back". The content of the piece is the electronically amplified sound of the hall and the audience.

Performances and recordings
4′33″ has been recorded on several occasions: Frank Zappa recorded it as part of A Chance Operation: The John Cage Tribute, on the Koch label, 1993; in 2002, James Tenney performed 4′33″ at Rudolf Schindler's historic Kings Road House in celebration of the work's 50th anniversary.

Several performances of 4′33″ including a "techno remix" by New Waver were broadcast on Australian radio station ABC Classic FM, as part of a program exploring "sonic responses" to Cage's work. The Swedish electronic band Covenant concluded their 2000 album United States of Mind with a rendition of 4′33″ entitled "You Can Make Your Own Music".

On January 16, 2004, at the Barbican Centre in London, the BBC Symphony Orchestra gave the UK's first orchestral performance of this work. The performance was broadcast live on BBC Radio 3, and one of the main challenges was that the station's emergency backup systems are designed to switch on and play music whenever apparent silence (dead air) lasting longer than a preset duration is detected. They had to be switched off for this performance. BBC Four broadcast the recording one hour later. On the same day, a tongue-in-cheek version was recorded by the staff of the UK Guardian newspaper.

In 2004, the work was voted to be number 40 in the ABC radio's Classic 100 piano countdown.

A silence of four minutes and thirty-three seconds appears as the penultimate track of the 2009 Living Colour album The Chair in the Doorway.

On December 5, 2010, an international simultaneous performance of Cage's 4′33″ took place involving over 200 performers, amateur and professional musicians, and artists. The global orchestra, conducted live by Bob Dickinson, former member of post-punk group Magazine, via video link, performed the piece in support of the Cage Against The Machine campaign to bring 4′33″ to Christmas number 1 in 2010. A second performance took place on December 12, 2010.

On November 17, 2015, The Late Show with Stephen Colbert uploaded a video of this piece being performed by a cat, showing that its performer isn't required to be human.

In May 2019, Mute Records released a compilation box set entitled STUMM433 featuring interpretations of 4′33″ by more than 50 current and alumni Mute artists including Laibach, Depeche Mode, Cabaret Voltaire, Einstürzende Neubauten, Goldfrapp, Moby, Erasure, and others.

On 31 October 2020, the Berlin Philharmonic closed their last concert before a government-mandated COVID-19 related lockdown with a performance of the piece conducted by Kirill Petrenko, "to draw attention to the plight of artists following the lockdown of cultural institutions".

2010 UK Christmas Number One campaign
In the week leading up to Christmas 2010, a Facebook page was created to encourage people in the UK to buy a new rendition of 4′33″ in the hope that it would prevent the winner of the seventh series of The X Factor from topping the UK Singles Chart and achieving the Christmas number one. The page was inspired by an earlier campaign in which a Facebook page set up by Jon Morter and his then wife, Tracey, prompted people to buy "Killing in the Name" by American rap metal protest group Rage Against the Machine in the week before Christmas 2009, and has therefore been dubbed "Cage Against the Machine". The creators of the Facebook page hoped that reaching number one would help to promote the piece and "make December 25 'a silent night'."

The campaign received support from several celebrities. It first came into prominence after it was mentioned by science writer Ben Goldacre on his Twitter profile. One of several similar campaigns, the Facebook page was called "the only effort this year with a hope of [reaching Number One]" by The Guardian journalist Tom Ewing in September. XFM DJ Eddy Temple-Morris also voiced his support on his blog, as did Guardian journalist Luke Bainbridge. This version of Cage's work failed to make number 1, but charted at number 21 on the UK Singles Chart.

Notes

Sources
 
 
 
 
 
 
  New York: Schirmer, .

Further reading
 Arns, Inke and Daniels, Dieter. 2012. Sounds Like Silence. Hartware MedienKunstVerein. Leipzig: Spector Books. 
 Davies, Stephen. 1997. "John Cage's 4′33″: Is it music?" Australasian Journal of Philosophy, vol. 75, no. 4, pp. 448–462. 
 Dodd, Julian. 2017. "What 4′33″ Is". Australasian Journal of Philosophy. 
 Gann, Kyle. 2010. No Such Thing as Silence: John Cage's 4′33″. Icons of America. New Haven: Yale University Press. 
 Garten, Joel. February 20, 2014. Interview With MoMA Curator David Platzker About the New Exhibition on John Cage. The Huffington Post.
 Katschthaler, Karl. 2016. "Absence, Presence and Potentiality: John Cage's 4′33″ Revisited", pp. 166–179. , in Wolf, Werner and Bernhart, Walter (eds.). Silence and Absence in Literature and Music. Leiden: Brill. 
 Lipov, Anatoly. 2015. "4'33" as the Play of Silent Presence. Stillness, or Anarchy of Silence?" Culture and Art, numbers 4, pp. 436–454,  and 6, pp. 669–686, .
 Liu, Gerald C. 2017. "The Epistle of 4′33″". In Music and the Generosity of God, 53–67. Cham: Palgrave Macmillan. .

External links
What John Cage's silent symphony really means", BBC News
"Radio 3 plays 'silent symphony'", BBC Online. (includes RealAudio sound file)
A quiet night out with Cage from the UK Observer
The Music of Chance from the UK Guardian newspaper
The Sounds of Silence further commentary by Peter Gutmann
Video of a 2004 orchestral performance

Audio
John Cage's 4′33″ in MIDI, OGG, Au, and WAV formats.
John Cage's 4′33″ from National Public Radio's "The 100 most important American musical works of the 20th century" (RealAudio file format)
Interview with Kyle Gann about 4'33" on The Next Track podcast

App
John Cage's 4′33″ as an iPhone app, published by the John Cage Trust (2014)

Compositions by John Cage
Postmodern art
Silence
1952 compositions